Dark Castle Entertainment is an American film production label and a division of Silver Pictures, It was formed in 1998 by Joel Silver, Robert Zemeckis, and Gilbert Adler. Susan Downey was the Vice President of Development until February 2009, a term running congruent to her tenure as a VP of Production at parent company Silver Pictures.

Dark Castle Entertainment's name pays homage to William Castle, a horror filmmaker from the 1950s and 1960s. When first formed, the goal was to remake Castle's horror films. After two remakes, it moved on to producing original material, along with remakes of non-Castle films. Starting with RocknRolla, the company began producing films in genres other than horror. While most of the company's films were initially poorly reviewed by critics, their 2009 film Splice eventually received better reviews.

Dark Castle Entertainment originally acquired the US rights to The Loft, as they did for Splice, with the intention of releasing the film through Warner Bros. When Joel Silver moved his office to Universal Pictures, he took Dark Castle, and the film, with him. Universal planned to release the film on August 29, 2014, but the studio pulled it from the schedule in favor of As Above, So Below. Universal and Dark Castle dropped the film, which was then picked up by Open Road Films and released on January 30, 2015.

Jason Blum reportedly has spoken to Silver twice about a co-production with Blumhouse Productions, for Universal to distribute, but they have yet to find the right project.

When featured at the start of a film, the studio's logo is presented with the point-of-view focused a roaring gargoyle head. As the camera zooms out, it's shown that the statue is on the titular castle, with a full moon shining behind it, after which lightning strikes across the entire scene.

Filmography

Lifetime grosses 

(A) Indicates minimum, as that is only two countries totals merged.

See also 
 William Castle
 Susan Downey
 Joel Silver
 Robert Zemeckis
 Warner Bros. Pictures
 Blumhouse Productions
 Ghost House Pictures
 Gold Circle Films
 Platinum Dunes
 Twisted Pictures
 Bloody Disgusting

References 

American companies established in 1999
Film production companies of the United States
 
Companies based in Los Angeles
Mass media companies established in 1999